The 1925 Colorado Silver and Gold football team was an American football team that represented the University of Colorado as a member of the Rocky Mountain Conference (RMC) during the 1925 college football season. In its sixth season under head coach Myron E. Witham, the team compiled an overall record of 6–3 record with a mark of 5–2 in conference play, placing fourth in the RMC. This marked the team's first full season in Norlin Stadium (later renamed Folsom Field, which was dedicated at the end of 1924 season.

Schedule

References

Colorado
Colorado Buffaloes football seasons
Colorado Silver and Gold football